Vinay Rajashekharappa Kulkarni is an Indian politician who was the minister for Mines and Geology in the Government of Karnataka. He was a Member of Legislative Assembly representing the Dharwad constituency, and belongs to the Indian National Congress party in Karnataka. Kulkarni is an agriculturist by profession and is involved in commercial dairy farming.

References

External links
 Profile

Indian National Congress politicians from Karnataka
1967 births
People from Dharwad district
Living people
Karnataka MLAs 2013–2018